Dieter Renz (3 March 1943 – 10 August 1969) was a German boxer. He competed in the men's heavyweight event at the 1968 Summer Olympics.

References

External links
 

1943 births
1969 deaths
German male boxers
Olympic boxers of West Germany
Boxers at the 1968 Summer Olympics
People from Bottrop
Sportspeople from Münster (region)
Heavyweight boxers